The article includes the discography of Agnetha Fältskog. 
For detailed information on her recordings with ABBA, see ABBA discography

Studio albums

Swedish-language albums

English-language albums

Compilation albums

Box sets

2004   Agnetha Fältskog De Första Åren
2008   Original Album Classics (5 CDs)
2010   Original Album Classics (3 CDs)

Singles

Swedish singles 

During the late 1960s and early 1970s, many singles were released from Agnetha Fältskog's Swedish solo albums. Three of them eventually showed up on the official Swedish singles chart (as indicated in the column "charts peak" in the table below).

Besides the official sales chart, the radio chart Svensktoppen can be regarded as the most important hit list in those days (and probably still today). The Svensktoppen chart is made up by jury votes, mostly listeners, and indicates the popularity of a song. Agnetha Fältskog's songs showed up on Svensktoppen numerous times, four of which even topped the charts while a total of 15 reached the top 5.

It was not always the A-side of a released single that would eventually show up on Svensktoppen. Sometimes also the B-side or even a non-single track managed to crack the top 10. For clarification, the song that eventually did show up on Svensktoppen can be found in the "Svensktoppen entry" column, with additional info about its date of entry, the highest position and the number of weeks the song stayed on the charts.

German singles

English singles 

 Poland- and South Africa-only release
 Dutch-only release
 Sweden-only release
 Germany- and Austria-only release in May 2013, UK release in November 2013
 Ultratip entries #19 and #67 respectively

References

External links 
 Unofficial Fansite for Agnetha Fältskog

Discographies of Swedish artists
Pop music discographies